The 2011 World Women's Curling Championship (branded as Capital One World Women's Curling Championship 2011 for sponsorship reasons) was held in Esbjerg, Denmark at the Granly Hockey Arena from March 19–27, 2011. The Swedish rink skipped by Anette Norberg won the final game over Canada's Amber Holland after a steal of two points in the tenth end.

Qualification
 (host country)
 (defending champion)
 (highest finisher from the Americas region at the 2010 World Championship)

Top six teams from the 2010 European Curling Championships
 (winner)
 (runner-up)
 (third place)

 (defeated  in World Challenge)
Top two teams from the 2010 Pacific Curling Championships
 (winner)
 (runner-up)

Teams
These are the confirmed teams.

Round-robin standings
Final Round-Robin Standings

Round-robin results
All times listed in Central European Time (UTC+1).

Draw 1Friday, March 18, 7:30pmDraw 2Saturday, March 19, 9:00amDraw 3Saturday, March 19, 2:00pmDraw 4Sunday, March 20, 2:00pmDraw 5Sunday, March 20, 7:00pmDraw 6Monday, March 21, 9:00amDraw 7Monday, March 21, 2:00pmDraw 8Monday, March 21, 7:00pmDraw 9Tuesday, March 22, 9:00amDraw 10Tuesday, March 22, 2:00pmDraw 11Tuesday, March 22, 7:00pmDraw 12Wednesday, March 23, 9:00amDraw 13Wednesday, March 23, 2:00pmDraw 14Wednesday, March 23, 7:00pmDraw 15Thursday, March 24, 9:00amDraw 16Thursday, March 24, 2:00pmDraw 17Thursday, March 24, 7:00pmTiebreaker March 25, 2:00 PMPlayoffs

1 vs. 2Friday, March 25, 7:00pm3 vs. 4Saturday, March 26, 10:00amSemifinalSaturday, March 26, 3:00pmBronze medal gameSunday, March 27, 10:00amGold medal gameSunday, March 27, 3:00pm''

Top 5 player percentages

References

Capital One World Women's Curling Championship, 2011
World Women's Curling Championship
Sport in Esbjerg
Curling competitions in Denmark
2011 in Danish women's sport
International sports competitions hosted by Denmark
March 2011 sports events in Europe